This is a list of the bishops of Nin, named after the town of Nin, Croatia. The Bishopric was most likely founded in the middle of the 9th century.

List

References

Sources

External links
 

Catholic Church in Croatia
Nin
Zadar County
Nin
History of Dalmatia
Croatia religion-related lists